Nexuiz is a first-person shooter developed by IllFonic and published by THQ for Microsoft Windows and Xbox 360. It used CryEngine 3 and it is based on the original free game Nexuiz (due to the name having been sold to Nexuiz, the free game continued its development under the Xonotic name). The servers for the Xbox 360 and PC versions were taken offline in February 2013 due to the closure of THQ.

Reception
Nexuiz received mixed reviews. GameSpot praised its price and fast pace, but Game Informer wrote that as a "haphazard port" of an old mod for an old game, it added little to the genre or original concept except for charging players.

See also
 Nexuiz, free first-person shooter video game whose name was sold by Alientrap to Illfonic.
 Xonotic, continuation of the free first-person shooter video game under a new name after the name was sold to Illfonic.

References

External links
 Nexuiz official website

2012 video games
Cancelled PlayStation 3 games
CryEngine games
Video games with Steam Workshop support
THQ games
Windows games
First-person shooters
Xbox 360 games
Xbox 360 Live Arcade games
Video games developed in the United States
IllFonic games